Anthony Finnegan ( 1973 – 18 September 2021) was a Gaelic footballer who played for the St Paul's club and also at senior level for the Antrim county team. Finnegan usually lined out as a defender.

Playing career
Finnegan first came to Gaelic football prominence at juvenile and underage levels with the St Paul's club in Belfast. He eventually progressed onto the club's senior team and won three County Championship titles. Finnegan lined out with the Antrim senior football team for over a decade, the highlights of which were an All-Ireland B Championship win over Fermanagh in 1999 when he was captain and an Ulster Championship win over Down the following year.

Personal life and death
Finnegan was diagnosed with motor neuron disease in August 2012 and raised awareness around the disease through campaigning and charity work. He died on 18 September 2021, aged 48.

Honours
St Paul's
Antrim Senior Football Championship: 1994, 1996, 1997

Antrim
All-Ireland Senior B Football Championship: 1999 (c)

References

1973 births
2021 deaths
Antrim inter-county Gaelic footballers
Deaths from motor neuron disease
Neurological disease deaths in Northern Ireland
St Paul's (Antrim) Gaelic footballers